James, Jim, Jimmy or Jamie Robertson may refer to:

Arts and entertainment
James Robertson (photographer) (1813–1888), English photographer and gem and coin engraver
James D Robertson (1931–2010), Scottish painter and senior lecturer at the Glasgow School of Art
James Logie Robertson (1846–1922), literary scholar, editor and author
James Robertson (conductor) (1912–1991), English conductor and musical director of Sadler's Wells Opera
James Robertson (novelist) (born 1958), Scottish novelist and poet
Jamie Robertson (born 1981), film score composer from England
James Napier Robertson (born 1982), New Zealand writer, film director and producer

Academia
 James Robertson (orientalist) (1714–1795), Scottish minister, professor
James I. Robertson Jr. (1930–2019), scholar on the American Civil War and professor at Virginia Tech
 James Burton Robertson (1800–1877), historian
 J. R. Robertson (James Robert Robertson, 1867–1928), educator and Freemason in South Australia
 James Alexander Robertson (1873–1939), American academic historian, archivist, translator and bibliographer
 James Craigie Robertson (1813–1882), Scottish Anglican churchman and historian
 James Duncan Robertson (1912–1993), Scottish professor of zoology

Military
James Robertson (British Army officer) (1717–1788), civil governor of the Province of New York, 1779–1783
James Robertson (Australian Army officer) (1878–1951), Australian Army officer
James Peter Robertson (1883–1917), Canadian recipient of the Victoria Cross
Jim Robertson (British Army officer) (1910–2004), British Army officer who commanded the 17th Gurkha Division
James Madison Robertson (died 1891), artillery officer in the United States Army

Politics
James William Robertson (1826–1876), first mayor of Queenstown, New Zealand
James Edwin Robertson (1840–1915), Canadian physician and politician
James Robertson, Baron Robertson (1845–1909), Scottish judge and Conservative politician
James Wilson Robertson (educator) (1857–1930), Canada's first Commissioner of Agriculture and Dairying
James B. A. Robertson (1871–1938), American lawyer and governor of Oklahoma
James Wilson Robertson (1899–1983), last British Head of Nigeria
James Robertson (judge) (1938–2019), United States federal judge
Jim Robertson (politician) (born 1945), Australian politician in the Northern Territory Legislative Assembly
James Robertson (Jamaican politician) (born 1966), Minister of Mining and Energy 2009 -May 2011
James Robertson (Trotskyist) (1928–2019), National Chairman of the Spartacist League of the United States
James N. Robertson (1913–1990), member of the Pennsylvania House of Representatives
James L. Robertson (Mississippi judge), justice on the Supreme Court of Mississippi

Sports

Football
James Robertson (footballer, born 1873) (1873–?), footballer (place of birth unknown)
Jimmy Robertson (footballer, born 1880) (1880–?), Scottish footballer who played as an inside right
Jimmy Robertson (footballer, born 1885) (1885–1968), Scottish football forward (Blackburn Rovers, Falkirk)
Jimmy Robertson (footballer, born 1913) (1913–?), for Bradford City
James Robertson (footballer, born 1929) (1929–2015), Scottish footballer who played as a winger
Jimmy Robertson (footballer, born 1944), Scottish footballer who played for Scotland
Jimmy Robertson (footballer, born 1955), Scottish footballer who played as a left winger
Jimmy Robertson (American football) (1901–1974), American football player, coach at Geneva College (1933)
 Jim Robertson (American football), American football player at Dartmouth College (1919–1921), coach at Oglethorpe University
Jim Robertson (footballer) (1903–1985), Australian footballer who played with Carlton in the VFL
James Robertson (soccer) (1891–1948), U.S. soccer full back
James Robertson (rugby union, born 1883) (1883–?), Scottish international rugby union player
James Robertson (rugby union, born 1854) (1854–1900), Scottish rugby union player

Other sports
James Robertson (cricketer, born 1850) (1850–1927), Scottish cricketer
James Robertson (cricketer, born 1844) (1844–1877), English cricketer
Jim Robertson (baseball) (1928–2015), Major League Baseball catcher
Jimmy Robertson (snooker player) (born 1986), English snooker player

Other
James Robertson (activist) (born 1928), British-born political and economic thinker and activist
James Robertson (explorer) (1742–1814), explorer and pioneer in what is now the State of Tennessee
James Robertson (grocer) (c. 1831–1914), founder of Robertson's, a UK brand of marmalades and jams
James Robertson (monk) (1758–1820), Scottish Benedictine monk and British Napoleonic War intelligence agent
James Robertson (psychoanalyst) (1911–1988), psychiatric social worker and psychoanalyst
James Robertson Automobiles manufactured the Robertson in Manchester in 1914
James Robertson (surveyor) (1753–1829), Scottish mapmaker in Jamaica
James Robertson (moderator) (1803–1860), Scottish minister and Moderator of the General Assembly of the Church of Scotland

See also
James Robertson Justice (1907–1975), British character actor
Robertson (disambiguation)
James Robinson (disambiguation)